Saturnino Lizano Gutiérrez (29 November 1826 – 19 April 1905) was President of Costa Rica from 6 July to 10 August 1882.

Early life and family 
He was born in Esparza, Costa Rica on November 29, 1826 to his parents Dámaso Lizano y Avendaño and Dámasa Gutiérrez y Flores. On April 14, 1875 he married Angélica Guardia Solórzano, daughter of President Tomás Guardia Gutiérrez. With her he fathered Gonzalo and María del Rosario Lizano Guardia.

His granddaughter, Estrella Zeledón Lizano, became the First Lady of Costa Rica from 1978 to 1982.

Private activities 
He was dedicated to agriculture and commerce, especially in the city of Puntarenas.

Public office 
He held several public offices, among them that of member of the Chamber of Representatives (1869–1870), member of the 1870 Constituents Assembly, Secretary of Government and annexed offices of Police and Industry (May - July 1876), Secretary General of Government (in charge of all Secretaries of Government) (July 1876), Secretary of Government and annexed offices Public Works and War and Navy (1876–1877), Secretary of State (July - August 1876), Financial Agent of Costa Rica in London (1877–1878), Secretary of Government with annexed offices (1880–1882) and First in Line to the Presidency of the Republic (1881–1882).

President of the Republic 
In June 1882, he was asked to take the Presidential Office due to President Guardia's ill state, and at his death on July 6 he became Titular President of the Republic. On July 20, without quitting his office, he asked the Seventh in Line to the Presidency Próspero Fernández Oreamuno to exercise the power, who on August 10 became Constitutional President.

Later posts 
After his departure he served as supply deputy for Alajuela, proprietary deputy for Puntarenas and governor of Puntarenas.

Death 
He died in San José, Costa Rica on April 19, 1905. His portrait was hung on the Former Presidents Hall of the Legislative Assembly in 1996.

No biography of his has ever been published.

References

1826 births
1905 deaths
People from Puntarenas Province
Costa Rican people of Spanish descent
Presidents of Costa Rica
Vice presidents of Costa Rica
Government ministers of Costa Rica
Members of the Legislative Assembly of Costa Rica
Costa Rican businesspeople
19th-century Costa Rican people
Foreign ministers of Costa Rica
Costa Rican liberals